The Winning Season is a 2004 television film with elements of a fantasy drama.  It chronicles a young boy's dream in 1985 with playing with the Pittsburgh Pirates' great Honus Wagner.  The film follows the dream to the point where the boy is assisting Wagner in his 1909 World Series duel with fellow hall-of-famer Ty Cobb.  It is adapted from the 1997 children's novel Honus & Me by Dan Gutman. The film premiered on TNT on April 4, 2004.

Production
The film was made by TNT and first broadcast on April 4, 2004.  Modine prepared for his role as Wagner by playing with a minor-league team, the IronBirds in Aberdeen, Maryland, owned by Cal Ripken Jr.

Critical reaction
Variety condemned the film as "schlocky" and sentimental.  Their critic found Modine's performance started to wear and Davis brought "little conviction", but director John Kent Harrison was praised for the performance he got out of Rendall.

Cast
 Matthew Modine - as Honus Wagner 
 Kristin Davis - as Mandy
 Mark Rendall - as Joe Stoshack
 William Lee Scott - as Ty Cobb

References

External links 
 
  The Winning Season at Yahoo! Movies

2004 films
2004 television films
2004 biographical drama films
2000s sports drama films
TNT Network original films
American biographical drama films
Sports films based on actual events
American baseball films
Films directed by John Kent Harrison
2004 drama films
2000s American films